The 2020–21 Nedbank Cup is the 2020–21 edition of South Africa's premier knockout club football (soccer) competition, the Nedbank Cup.

As a result of the suspension of amateur football due to the COVID-19 pandemic, unlike in previous years, no amateur teams took part. Instead, all 16 Premier Soccer League (PSL) clubs and all 16 National First Division (NFD) teams entered the main draw of 32 teams, in spite of eight NFD teams losing their earlier first round matches.

Teams are not seeded, and the first sides drawn receive home-ground advantage. There are no replays in the tournament, and any games which end in a draw after 90 minutes are subject to 30 minutes extra time followed by penalties if necessary.

First round
As the amateur teams which normally enter in the Second Round were unable to take part due to the COVID-19 pandemic, the Premier Soccer League decided in January 2021 to restore the eight losing teams from the First Round and include them in the draw for the Second Round. Hence no teams were eliminated in this round and all progressed.

Second round

Third round

Quarter-finals

Semi-finals

Final

External links
Nedbank Cup Official Website

Notes and references

2020–21 domestic association football cups
2020–21 in South African soccer
2020-21
Association football events curtailed due to the COVID-19 pandemic